Thalirukal is a 1967 Indian Malayalam film, directed by M. S. Mani. The film stars Sathyan, Paul Vengola, C. R. Lakshmi and Chandni in lead roles. The film had musical score by A. T. Ummer.

Cast
Sathyan
Paul Vengola
C. R. Lakshmi
Chandni
Kottayam Chellappan
M. G. Menon
Nagesh
S. P. Pillai
Ushakumari
Sunitha

Soundtrack
The music was composed by A. T. Ummer and the lyrics were written by Dr Pavithran.

References

External links
 

1967 films
1960s Malayalam-language films